Guantao County is a county of southern Hebei province, China, bordering Shandong's Guan County and Linqing to the east across the Wei Canal. The area was formerly part of Shandong Province.

Administrative divisions
There are 4 towns and 4 townships under the county's administration.

Towns:
Guantao, Weisengzhai, Fangzhai, Zibao

Townships:
Nanxucun Township, Luqiao Township, Wangqiao Township, Shoushansi Township

Climate

References

 
County-level divisions of Hebei
Handan